Stand is Avalon's ninth release and their sixth studio album.  Originally titled The Other Side and slated to release in September 2005, Stand was actually released on January 24, 2006.  The album includes a remake of a Russ Taff song, "We Will Stand", that features an additional bridge written by Taff, his wife Tori, and James Hollihan, Jr.  Stand marked the 10-year anniversary for the group.

Track listing

Personnel 
Avalon
 Janna Long – vocals
 Jody McBrayer – vocals
 Melissa Greene – vocals
 Greg Long – vocals

Musicians
 Shaun Shankel – keyboards, acoustic piano, programming, arrangements, string arrangements 
 Bernie Herms – keyboards, acoustic piano, arrangements, string arrangements 
 Mark Hammond – programming, drums, string arrangements
 Brian Gocher – programming, acoustic guitar 
 Rob Hawkins – guitars 
 Will Owsley – guitars 
 Tony Lucido – bass
 Joey Canaday – bass
 Mark Hill – bass 
 Adam Nitti – bass 
 Shannon Forrest – drums 
 Scott Williamson – drums 
 John Mock – Uilleann pipes
 David Hamilton – string arrangements
 David Davidson – string arrangements
 Steve Mauldin – orchestrations 
 Russ Taff – vocals (6)

String Section
 David Angell, Monisa Angell, Janet Askey, David Davidson, Jack Jezioro, Anthony LaMarchina, Sarighani Reist, Pamela Sixfin, Mary Kathryn Vanosdale and Kristin Wilkinson – string players

Choir on "We Will Stand"
 Alexia Counce
 Vicki Dvoracek
 Maribeth Johnson
 Shelly Johnson
 Dennis Morgan 
 Tami Pryce

Radio Singles 
 "Love Won't Leave You"
 "Orphans of God"
 "Somehow You Are"

References

2006 albums
Avalon (band) albums